This is a list of township-level divisions of the province of Ningxia, People's Republic of China (PRC). There are 232 townships.

Yinchuan

Jinfeng District
5 subdistricts
Changchengzhonglu (长城中路街道), Shanghaixilu (上海西路街道), Beijingzhonglu (北京中路街道), Huanghe Donglu (黄河东路街道) and Mancheng Beijie (满城北街街道)

2 towns
Fengdeng (丰登镇) and Liangtian (良田镇)

Xingqing District
10 subdistricts
Jiefangxijie (解放西街街道), Wenhuajie (文化街街道), Funingjie (富宁街街道), Xinhuajie (新华街街道), 
Yuhuanggebei (玉皇阁北街街道), Qianjinjie (前进街街道), Zhongshannanjie (中山南街街道), Yingulu (银古路街道), Shenglijie (胜利街街道), Lijingjie (丽景街街道),  and Fenghuangbeijie (凤凰北街街道): was merged to other.

2 towns:
Zhangzheng (掌政镇): was merged to other. and Daxin (大新镇): was merged to other.

2 townships:
Tonggui (通贵乡): was merged to other. and Yueya (月牙湖乡): was merged to other.

Xixia District
5 subdistricts
Helanshanxilu (贺兰山西路街道), Ninghualu (宁华路街道), Shuofanglu (朔方路街道), Wenchanglu (文昌路街道), and Beijingxilu (北京西路街道)

2 towns
Zhenbeibu (镇北堡镇), and Xingjing (兴泾镇)

Lingwu City
1 subdistrict
Chengqu (城区街道)

6 towns
Dongta (东塔镇), Linhe (临河镇), Majiatan (马家滩镇), Ningdong (宁东镇), Chongxing (崇兴镇), and Haojiaqiao (郝家桥镇)

1 township
Baitugang (白土岗乡)

2 other
Raw Wolf Skin Ziliang Administration Committee (狼皮子梁管委会), and Lingwu Farm (灵武农场)

Helan County
4 towns
Xigang (习岗镇), Hongguang (洪广镇), Ligang (立岗镇), and Jingui (金贵镇)

1 township
Changxin (常信乡)

2 other
Nuanquan Farm (暖泉农场), and Nanliang Taizi Administration Committee (南梁台子管委会)

Yongning County
5 towns
Yanghe (杨和镇), Minning (闽宁镇), Wanghong (望洪镇), Wangyuan (望远镇), and Lijun (李俊镇)

1 township
Shengli (胜利乡)

2 other
Yuquanying Farm (玉泉营农场), and Huangyangtan Farm (黄羊滩农场)

Guyuan

Yuanzhou District
Yuanzhou County administers 1 subdistrict 5 towns and 4 townships.
 
1 subdistrict
Jiqiang (南关街道)

5 Towns
Sanying (三营镇), Touying (头营镇), Pengbu           (彭堡镇), Zhangyi (张易镇), and 	Kaicheng (开城镇)

4 Townships
Zhaike (寨科乡), Tanshan (炭山乡), Hechuan (河川乡), and Zhonghe (中河乡)

Jingyuan County
Jingyuan County administers 3 towns and 4 townships.

3 Towns
Xiangshui (香水镇), Liupanshan (六盘山镇), and Jingheyuan           (泾河源镇)

4 Townships
Dawan (大湾乡), Huanghua (黄花乡), Xingsheng (兴盛乡), and Xinmin (新民乡)

Longde County
Longde County administers 3 towns and 7 townships.

3 Towns
Chengguan (城关镇), Liancai (联财镇), and Shatang           (沙塘镇)

7 Townships
Shanhe (山河乡), Fengling (凤岭乡), Zhangcheng (张程乡), Shenlin (神林乡), Yanghe (杨河乡), Guanzhuang (观庄乡), Haoshui (好水乡), Chenjin (陈靳乡): was merged, Dian'an (奠安乡): was merged, and Wenbu (温堡乡): was merged

Pengyang County
Pengyang County administers 3 towns and 7 townships.

3 Towns
Baiyang (白阳镇), Gucheng (古城镇), and Wangwa (王洼镇)

7 Townships
Jiaocha (交岔乡), Luowa (罗洼乡), Mengyuan (孟塬乡), 	Xiaocha (小岔乡), Fengzhuang (冯庄乡), Chengyang (城阳乡), and Xinji (新集乡)

Xiji County
Xiji County administers 3 towns and 7 townships.

3 Towns
Jiqiang (吉强镇), Pingfeng (平峰镇), and Xinglong           (兴隆镇)

7 Townships
Wangmin (王民乡), Xitan (西滩乡), Xingping (兴平乡), Zhenhu (震湖乡), Majian (马建乡), Tianping (田坪乡), and Hongyao (红耀乡)

Shizuishan City

Dawukou District
10 subdistricts

Renminlu (人民路街道), Chaoyang (朝阳街道), Changsheng (长胜街道), Jinlin (锦林街道), Changxing (长兴街道), Goukou (沟口街道), Baijigou (白芨沟街道), Shitanjing (石炭井街道), Qingshan (青山街道),and Changcheng (长城街道)

Huinong District
6 subdistricts
Beijie (北街街道), Zhongjie (中街街道), Nanjie (南街街道), Yucailu (育才路街道), Huochezhan (火车站街道), and Hebin (河滨街道)

3 towns
Yuanyi (园艺镇), Weizha (尾闸镇), and Hongguozi (红果子镇)

1 township
Lihe (礼和乡)

Pingluo County
7 towns
Chengguan (城关镇), Taole (陶乐镇), Chonggang (崇岗镇), Yaofu (姚伏镇), Touzha (头闸镇), Baofeng (宝丰镇),and Huangquqiao (黄渠桥镇)

3 townships
Tongfu (通伏乡), Qukou (渠口乡),and Lingsha (灵沙乡)

Wuzhong City

Hongsibu District
2 towns
Hongsibu (红寺堡镇)Taiyangshan (太阳山镇)

1 township
Dahe (大河乡)

Litong District
Litong City administers  8 towns and 2 townships.

8 towns
Gucheng (古城镇), Shangqiao (上桥镇), Shengli (胜利镇), Jinxing (金星镇), Jinji (金积镇), Jinyintan (金银滩镇), Gaozha (高闸镇),and Biandangou (扁担沟镇)

2 townships
Banqiao (板桥乡), Malianqu (马莲渠乡), 
Dongtasi (东塔寺乡): was merged to other.,and Guojiaqiao (郭家桥乡) : was merged to other.

Qingtongxia City
Qingtongxia City administers 1 subdistrict 7 towns and 2 others : farms.

1 subdistrict
Yumin (裕民街道)

7 towns
Xiaoba (小坝镇), Chenyuantan (陈袁滩镇), Xiakou (峡口镇), 
Qujing (瞿靖镇), Yesheng (叶盛镇), Qingtongxia (青铜峡镇),and Daba (大坝镇)

2 others : farms
Shuxin Forestry Farm (树新林场),and Lianhu Farm (连湖农场)

Tongxin County
Tongxin County administers 6 towns and 3 townships.

6 towns
Yuhai (豫海镇), Dingtang (丁塘镇),Wangtuan (王团镇),
Xiamaguan (下马关镇), Weizhou (韦州镇),and Hexi (河西镇)

3 townships
Xinglong (兴隆乡), Magaozhuang (马高庄乡),and Tianlaozhuang (田老庄乡)

Yanchi County
Yanchi County administers 4 towns and 4 townships.

4 towns
Huamachi (花马池镇), Gaoshawo (高沙窝镇), Hui′anbu (惠安堡镇),and Dashuikeng (大水坑镇)

4 townships
Mahuangshan (麻黄山乡), Qingshan (青山乡), Fengjigou (冯记沟乡),and Wanglejing (王乐井乡)

Zhongwei City

Haiyuan County
Haiyuan County administers 5 towns and 5 townships.

5 Towns
Sanhe (三河镇), Qiying (七营镇),	Xi′an (西安镇), 	Liwang (李旺镇),  and Haicheng (海城镇)

5 Townships
Jiatang (贾塘乡), Zhengqi (郑旗乡), Gaoya (高崖乡), 	Guanqiao (关桥乡), and Shutai (树台乡)

Zhongning County
Zhongning County has 5 towns and 5 townships.
5 towns
Ning′an (宁安镇), Enhe (恩和镇), Xinbu (新堡镇), Shikong (石空镇), and Mingsha(鸣沙镇)

5 townships
Xutao (徐套乡), Hanjiaoshui (喊叫水乡), Yuding (余丁乡), 
Baima (白马乡), and Zhouta (舟塔乡)

References

Ningxia
 
 Townships